Eagle Academy for Young Men of Newark is an all boys' public school in Newark in Essex County, New Jersey, United States, operating as part of the Newark Public Schools. The Eagle Academy Foundation supports the educational programs of this school and other all-boys' schools in New York City. As of 2012, Eagle Academy of Newark is the only all-boys' public school in the State of New Jersey. It is Newark's first single gender public school; it has a university preparatory curriculum and has small class sizes. It is located in the Louise A. Spencer School complex in the Central Ward.

As of the 2018–19 school year, the school had an enrollment of 239 students and 25.0 classroom teachers (on an FTE basis), for a student–teacher ratio of 9.6:1. There were 117 students (49.0% of enrollment) eligible for free lunch and 12 (5.0% of students) eligible for reduced-cost lunch.

History
In September 2012 the school opened with 80 students in the 6th grade. A new grade will be added each year until the school becomes a grade 6-12 school. The school anticipated having about 500 students total once the grade levels are maxed out. The first principal was Vaughn Thompson, who had previously worked at the Young Scholars Academy of Bronx and had resigned from there.

In 2012 the American Civil Liberties Union of New Jersey stated that if boys have a single gender school, girls should have the same opportunity. NPS later opened Girls' Academy of Newark as the all-girl counterpart.

References

Further reading
 Mooney, John. "All-Boys Public School Coming to Newark" (Archive). NJ Spotlight. March 28, 2012.
 Chen, Grace. "All-Boys School to Open in Newark this Fall." Public School Review.

External links
 Eagle Academy for Young Men of Newark

2012 establishments in New Jersey
Boys' schools in New Jersey
Education in Newark, New Jersey
Educational institutions established in 2012
Middle schools in New Jersey